Nensi (Нэнси) is a Ukrainian musical band founded in 1992 in the city of Kostiantynivka (Donetsk Oblast) by the singer-songwriter Anatoly Bondarenko. The band is best known for its song "Dym sigaret s mentolom" ("Дым сигарет с ментолом").

Nensi received positive feedback from music critics, being credited as a successful project of contemporary pop-culture.

On 31 January 2016, one of the band members, Sergey Bondarenko, was arrested in Sheremetyevo International Airport, when returning to Russia from Germany, being accused of security threats to Russia. Later he was deported back to Germany with an interdiction to not re-enter  Russia until 2018.

On 18 October 2018, Sergey Bondarenko died at the age of 31.

Discography

Videos

Honours and awards 

 1996 – Best Russian band
 2004 – Laureate of the contest "Боевое Братство"
 2007 – Knight of the order "Служение искусству"
 2010 – Medal "Талант и призвание"

References

External links
 Official website
 

Musical groups established in 1992
Russian musical groups
Russian pop music groups
Russian rock music groups
Ukrainian pop music groups
Ukrainian rock music groups